The Tornante Company, LLC is an American privately held investment firm founded in 2005 and owned by former Paramount Pictures and The Walt Disney Company CEO Michael Eisner. Tornante invests in, acquires, and operates media and entertainment companies.

When Eisner was bicycling around Italy, he saw a signpost that inspired the name Tornante for his company. Tornante means "hairpin turn" in Italian.

History
The Tornante Company was founded by Michael Eisner in 2005, after he left The Walt Disney Company. In 2006, Tornante formed Vuguru production company with backing from Rogers Media of Canada. The company made a $12.5 million venture funding round investment in Veoh in April 2006. Tornante purchased Team Baby Entertainment, a maker of infants and toddlers sports-related DVDs in June 2006. On March 5, 2007, the company and Madison Dearborn Partners purchased Topps for $385 million. Tornante planned to have Team Baby merge with Topps.

In June 2015, Tornante Co. formed Tornante-Sinclair LLC, a TV production company, with Sinclair TV Group. Eisner's company signed in November 2015 a worldwide distribution deal with Universal Pictures to release the firm's self-funded slate of films. In August 2017, Tornante closed on the purchase of the Portsmouth Football Club for an undisclosed deal; however, BBC reported that Eisner had offered £5.67 million "and will invest an extra £10m."

Holdings
Current investment holdings of the firm include:

 AirTime
 Clique Media (now Clique Brands)
Metaverse
 Omaze
 Portsmouth Football Club
Rad
Spark Neuro
 TaskRabbit
 Tornante-Sinclair LLC (50%) a joint venture TV production company with Sinclair TV Group for court shows, comedy programs, game shows and talk shows in first-run syndicated 
 Tornante Television, Los Angeles based subsidiary overseeing Tornante-Sinclair via Tornante co-president, Lauren Corrao. The unit also produces the adult animated comedies BoJack Horseman and Tuca & Bertie, and in conjunction with Trifecta Entertainment and Media the syndicated court reality show Judge Faith.
 Vuguru (2006–) production company with backing from Rogers Media of Canada

Former holdings of the firm include:
 Team Baby Entertainment (June 2006) a maker of infants and toddlers sports-related DVDs, which merged with Topps
 Veoh (stake) April 2006–April 7, 2010

References

External links
 

The Tornante Company
Investment companies of the United States
Holding companies of the United States
Private equity firms of the United States
Holding companies established in 2005
Michael Eisner